696 Leonora is a Meliboean asteroid orbiting the Sun in the asteroid belt. It was discovered 10 January 1910 by American astronomer Joel Hastings Metcalf, at Taunton, Massachusetts. It was named by Arthur Snow of the United States Naval Observatory, who computed the orbit for the planet, after his wife, Mary Leonora Snow.

References

External links 
 Lightcurve plot of 696 Leonora, Palmer Divide Observatory, B. D. Warner (2005)
 Asteroid Lightcurve Database (LCDB), query form (info )
 Dictionary of Minor Planet Names, Google books
 Asteroids and comets rotation curves, CdR – Observatoire de Genève, Raoul Behrend
 Discovery Circumstances: Numbered Minor Planets (1)-(5000) – Minor Planet Center
 
 

Meliboea asteroids
Leonora
Leonora
XC-type asteroids (Tholen)
19100110